The 69th New York State Legislature, consisting of the New York State Senate and the New York State Assembly, met from January 6 to May 13, 1846, during the second year of Silas Wright's governorship, in Albany.

Background
Under the provisions of the New York Constitution of 1821, 32 Senators were elected on general tickets in eight senatorial districts for four-year terms. They were divided into four classes, and every year eight Senate seats came up for election. Assemblymen were elected countywide on general tickets to a one-year term, the whole Assembly being renewed annually.

On May 13, 1845, an "Act recommending a Convention of the people of this State" was passed, submitting at the next State election to the people the question whether they wanted to call a convention to amend the State Constitution.

At this time there were two major political parties: the Democratic Party and the Whig Party. The Democratic Party was split into two factions: the "Barnburners" and the "Hunkers." The radical abolitionists appeared as the Liberty Party. The Anti-Rent Party nominated some candidates, but mostly cross-endorsed Whigs or Democrats, according to their opinion on the rent issue. In and near New York City, the originally called American Republican Party became now known as the "Native Americans", "Nativists" or "Know Nothings".

Elections
The State election was held on November 4, 1845. The question whether to hold a Constitutional convention was answered in the affirmative, with 213,084 votes for and 33,283 votes against it.

State Senator Gideon Hard (8th D.) was re-elected.

Sessions
On January 5, the Democratic assemblymen met in caucus and nominated William C. Crain (Barnb.) for Speaker with 48 votes against 22 for Benjamin Bailey (Barnb.).

The Legislature met for the regular session at the Old State Capitol in Albany on January 6, 1846; and adjourned on May 13.

William C. Crain (D) was elected Speaker with 73 votes against 44 for John Young (W) and 7 for Ira Harris (A-R). William W. Dean (D) was elected Clerk of the Assembly with 77 votes against 48 for George W. Weed (W).

On February 2, the Legislature elected Adjutant General Thomas Farrington (Barnb.) to succeed Benjamin Enos (Hunker) as State Treasurer.

On March 7, Andrew G. Chatfield (Hunker) was elected Speaker pro tempore with 50 votes against 45 for Benjamin Bailey (Barnb.) and 3 for Alvah Worden (W), to preside over the Assembly during the absence of Speaker Crain.

On March 30, the Legislature re-apportioned the Assembly districts: Chautauqua, Chenango, Columbia, Cortland, Madison, Ontario and Wyoming counties lost one seat each; Albany, Erie, Kings and St. Lawrence counties gained one seat each; and New York City gained three seats. The total number of assemblymen remained 128.

On April 22, the Legislature enacted that the number of delegates to the Constitutional convention should be the same as the number of assemblymen, and that they should be elected according to the new Assembly apportionment.

The delegates to the Constitutional convention were elected on April 28.

On April 29, Samuel Young was elected president pro tempore of the Senate.

On May 13, the Legislature re-apportioned the Senate districts: Kings County was transferred from the 1st to the 2nd District; Ulster County from the 2nd to the 3rd District; and Schenectady County from the 3rd to the 4th District.

The Constitutional convention met at Albany on June 1; and adjourned on October 9. Ex-Lt. Gov. John Tracy (D) was elected President of the convention with 69 votes against a scattered vote of the Whigs. The amended Constitution abolished rotative renewal of the Senate, required all legislators to be elected in single districts, and made the State cabinet offices elective by popular ballot. The new Constitution was submitted to the electorate at the next State election, and was adopted by a large majority.

The Whig state convention met on September 23 at Utica; Philip Hone was Chairman. They nominated Assemblyman John Young for Governor; and Hamilton Fish for Lieutenant Governor.

The Democratic state convention met on October 1 at Syracuse; Chester Loomis was Chairman. They nominated Gov. Silas Wright and Lt. Gov. Addison Gardner for re-election.

The Anti-Rent state convention met in October at Beardsley's Hotel in Albany, and endorsed John Young (W) for Governor; and Lt. Gov. Addison Gardiner (D) for re-election.

The Native American state convention nominated Ogden Edwards for Governor; and State Senator George Folsom for Lieutenant Governor.

The Liberty state convention nominated Henry Bradley for Governor and William L. Chaplin for Lieutenant Governor.

State Senate

Districts
 The First District (4 seats) consisted of Kings, New York and Richmond counties.
 The Second District (4 seats) consisted of Dutchess, Orange, Putnam, Queens, Rockland, Suffolk, Sullivan, Ulster and Westchester counties.
 The Third District (4 seats) consisted of Albany, Columbia, Delaware, Greene, Rensselaer, Schenectady and Schoharie counties.
 The Fourth District (4 seats) consisted of Clinton, Essex, Franklin, Fulton, Hamilton, Herkimer, Montgomery, St. Lawrence, Saratoga, Warren and Washington counties.
 The Fifth District (4 seats) consisted of Jefferson, Lewis, Madison, Oneida, Oswego and Otsego counties.
 The Sixth District (4 seats) consisted of Allegany, Broome, Cattaraugus, Chemung, Chenango, Livingston, Steuben, Tioga and Tompkins counties.
 The Seventh District (4 seats) consisted of Cayuga, Cortland, Onondaga, Ontario, Seneca, Wayne and Yates counties.
 The Eighth District (4 seats) consisted of Chautauqua, Erie, Genesee, Monroe, Niagara, Orleans and Wyoming counties.

Note: There are now 62 counties in the State of New York. The counties which are not mentioned in this list had not yet been established, or sufficiently organized, the area being included in one or more of the abovementioned counties.

Members
The asterisk (*) denotes members of the previous Legislature who continued in office as members of this Legislature. William H. Van Schoonhoven changed from the Assembly to the Senate.

Employees
 Clerk: Isaac R. Elwood

State Assembly

Districts

 Albany County (3 seats)
 Allegany County (2 seats)
 Broome County (1 seat)
 Cattaraugus County (2 seats)
 Cayuga County (3 seats)
 Chautauqua County (3 seats)
 Chemung County (1 seat)
 Chenango County (3 seats)
 Clinton County (1 seat)
 Columbia County (3 seats)
 Cortland County (2 seats)
 Delaware County (2 seats)
 Dutchess County (3 seats)
 Erie County (3 seats)
 Essex County (1 seat)
 Franklin County (1 seat)
 Fulton and Hamilton counties (1 seat)
 Genesee County (2 seats)
 Greene County (2 seats)
 Herkimer County (2 seats)
 Jefferson County (3 seats)
 Kings County (2 seats)
 Lewis County (1 seat)
 Livingston County (2 seats)
 Madison County (3 seats)
 Monroe County (3 seats)
 Montgomery County (2 seats)
 The City and County of New York (13 seats)
 Niagara County (2 seats)
 Oneida County (4 seats)
 Onondaga County (4 seats)
 Ontario County (3 seats)
 Orange County (3 seats)
 Orleans County (1 seat)
 Oswego County (2 seats)
 Otsego County (3 seats)
 Putnam County (1 seat)
 Queens County (1 seat)
 Rensselaer County (3 seats)
 Richmond County (1 seat)
 Rockland County (1 seat)
 St. Lawrence County (2 seats)
 Saratoga County (2 seats)
 Schenectady County (1 seat)
 Schoharie County (2 seats)
 Seneca County (1 seat)
 Steuben County (3 seats)
 Suffolk County (2 seats)
 Sullivan County (1 seat)
 Tioga County (1 seat)
 Tompkins County (2 seats)
 Ulster County (2 seats)
 Warren County (1 seat)
 Washington (2 seats)
 Wayne County (2 seats)
 Westchester County (2 seats)
 Wyoming County (2 seats)
 Yates County (1 seat)

Note: There are now 62 counties in the State of New York. The counties which are not mentioned in this list had not yet been established, or sufficiently organized, the area being included in one or more of the abovementioned counties.

Assemblymen
The asterisk (*) denotes members of the previous Legislature who continued as members of this Legislature.

Party affiliations follow the vote on Speaker.

Employees
 Clerk: William W. Dean
 Sergeant-at-Arms: Samuel S. Wood
 Doorkeeper: Horatio G. Pope
 Assistant Doorkeeper: Israel R. Neahr
 Second Assistant Doorkeeper: Francis N. Bradt

Notes

References

Sources
 The New York Civil List compiled by Franklin Benjamin Hough (Weed, Parsons and Co., 1858) [pg. 58f for Constitutional convention; pg. 109 and 441 for Senate districts; pg. 135 for senators; pg. 148f for Assembly districts; pg. 231f for assemblymen]
 Political History of the State of New York from January 1, 1841, to January 1, 1847, Vol III, including the Life of Silas Wright (Hall & Dickson, Syracuse NY, 1848; pg. 570 to 686)
 Journal of the Senate (69th Session) (1846)
 The Whig Almanac for 1847 (pg. 60)

069
1846 in New York (state)
1846 U.S. legislative sessions